Jens Berents Christiansen (born in 1978), also known as Rumpistol, is a Danish producer and musician, who writes and performs electronic music.
He has been releasing music since 2003 and has received positive reviews from magazines such as Intro.de De:Bug and Danish magazine GAFFA. The latter gave Rumpistol 6/6 for his 2008 album Dynamo.

Rumpistol creates music ranging from neoclassical music to electronic music in the electronica-genre with inspiration from ambient, dub, IDM, techno and dubstep, made for both the dance floor and for sitting audiences.

Christiansen also plays keyboards and produces for the band Kalaha and has produced or contributed to releases from Lukkif and collaborating with artists like Baiana System (BZ), Efterklang, Blue Foundation and Indians.

In 2019 Kalaha won Carl Prisen in the category Best Roots Composer (for the EP Mama Ngoma).
In 2016 Christiansen co-wrote and co-produced the album Masala which won a Danish Music Award Jazz for Best Special release  and was also nominated for Carl Prisen in 2018.
In 2016 his music was used for the opening ceremony for the Paralympics in Rio de Janeiro.
Rumpistol has played live at Roskilde Festival (DK) in 2006 and 2009, at MUTEK Montréal (CAN) in 2012, at Multiplicidade (BZ) in 2015 at Boiler Room UK in 2012.

Rumpistol has released on several labels including his own label Rump Recordings, The Rust Music, Øen Records, Project: Mooncircle and Iboga Records.

Selected Discography

Studio Albums by Rumpistol

Singles & EPs by Rumpistol

Albums by Kalaha

Singles & EPs by Kalaha

Remixes by Rumpistol

Career 
After starting his career playing keyboard and guitar for the band Magtværk, Christiansen moved on to launch his solo career as Rumpistol in 2003.

References

1978 births
Danish producers
Danish music people
Living people